"" is a song by Swedish pop group Estraden and Swedish singer Victor Leksell, released in August 2019.

Charts

Weekly charts

Year-end charts

Certifications

References

2019 singles
2019 songs
Sony Music singles
Swedish pop songs